Timothy Sheader (born 23 November 1971 in Scarborough, North Yorkshire) is a British theatre director. Sheader read Law with French at the University of Birmingham before moving into a career in theatre. Since 2007, he has been Artistic Director at Regent's Park Open Air Theatre.

Theatrical career
Sheader started his theatrical career as a Trainee Director at the Orange Tree Theatre in Richmond before becoming an Assistant Director with the Royal Shakespeare Company for two years. Subsequent to his previous directorial work at Regent's Park Open Air Theatre in 2005, he was appointed Artistic Director for the venue in November 2007, being responsible for productions from the 2008 season.

Under Sheader’s tenure, over the last 10 years, Open Air Theatre productions have won seven Olivier Awards, three Evening Standard Awards and six WhatsOnStage Awards. In 2008, A Midsummer Night’s Dream re-imagined for everyone aged six and over was the first of many successful Shakespeare plays specially adapted for younger audiences. And in 2009, The Importance of Being Earnest was introduced as the first non-Shakespeare play to be produced at the theatre for several years. His directorial successes at Regent’s Park include: Hello, Dolly! (2009) which won three Olivier Awards, including Best Musical Revival, Into the Woods (2010) which transferred to New York, Crazy For You (2011) which was a double Olivier Award-winner and transferred to the West End, To Kill a Mockingbird(2013/14) which went on tour in the UK, ending at the Barbican in mid-2015, and Jesus Christ Superstar (2016) the sell-out production that won the Olivier Award for Best Musical Revival and Evening Standard Award for Best Musical – the production returned to the Open Air Theatre for an extended engagement in 2017 ahead of a run at the Lyric Opera of Chicago in Spring 2018. The production played a season at the Barbican Theatre in 2019, ahead of a North American Tour, and in the summer of 2020 it was reconceived as Jesus Christ Superstar: The Concert, the first West End production to re-open during the coronavirus pandemic.

As Director for Regent's Park Open Air Theatre

* Prior to his appointment as Artistic Director in 2007.

Other Notable Work
In 2013 Sheader worked with the Chichester Festival Theatre to direct a new production of Barnum, starring Christopher Fitzgerald. The previous year he directed The Magistrate at London's National Theatre starring John Lithgow. At the beginning of 2015 he directed My Fair Lady at the Aarhus Teater in Denmark.

Other productions that Sheader has directed include  Imagine This (New London); Hobson's Choice, The Clandestine Marriage, Love in a Maze (Watermill Theatre); Rodgers and Hammerstein's Cinderella, The Three Musketeers (Bristol Old Vic); The Star Throwers, Unless (Stephen Joseph Theatre, Scarborough); Misconceptions (Derby Playhouse); Streetcar to Tennessee (Young Vic); Achilles (Edinburgh Fringe First); Wild, Wild Women (Orange Tree); Arms and the Man (National Tour) Piaf, Sweet Charity (Sheffield Crucible). 2018 also saw Sheader's Jesus Christ Superstar play at Chicago's Lyric Opera. In 2019, Sheader made his Royal Opera House debut, directing the World Premiere of The Monstrous Child  at the Royal Opera House.

References 

Living people
English theatre directors
People from Scarborough, North Yorkshire
1971 births